Mountjoy Castle is situated near the village of Brockagh, in Magheralamfield townland in County Tyrone, Northern Ireland, on a hill overlooking Lough Neagh.

The Castle is a State Care Historic Monument in the townland of Magheralamfield, in Dungannon and South Tyrone Borough Council area, at grid ref: H9015 6870.

See also 

Castles in Northern Ireland

References 

Castles in County Tyrone
Ruined castles in Northern Ireland